Carex socotrana is a species of sedge in the family Cyperaceae, native to the island of Socotra. It is known from only two populations in the Hajhir Mountains.

References

socotrana
Endemic flora of Socotra
Plants described in 2017